Fremont County was a county of the United States Territory of Kansas that existed for two years from February 7, 1859, to January 29, 1861.

History
In July 1858, gold was discovered along the South Platte River in Arapahoe County of Kansas Territory (now in Colorado), precipitating the Pike's Peak Gold Rush.  To provide local government for the gold mining region, the Territorial Legislature split Arapahoe County into six counties on February 7, 1859: a much smaller Arapahoe County, Broderick County, El Paso County, Fremont County, Montana County, and Oro County.  Fremont County was named in honor of soldier, explorer, and politician John Charles Frémont.  None of these six counties were ever organized.  Many residents of the mining region felt disconnected from the territorial government, and they formed their own Territory of Jefferson on October 24, 1859.

Following the Republican Party election victories in 1860, the United States Congress admitted Kansas to the Union.  The Kansas Act of Admission excluded the portion of the Kansas Territory west of the 25th meridian west from Washington from the new state, and Fremont County and the rest of this region reverted to unorganized territory.

On February 28, 1861, the Colorado Territory was organized to govern this unorganized territory and adjacent areas of the New Mexico, Utah, and Nebraska Territories.  The new Colorado General Assembly organized 17 counties on November 1, 1861, including a new Fremont County.

See also
Fremont County, Colorado
Historic Colorado counties
History of Colorado
History of Kansas
Pike's Peak Gold Rush
Territory of Colorado
Territory of Jefferson
Territory of Kansas

References

External links
Colorado County Evolution by Don Stanwyck
Kansas State Historical Society website
Colorado State Historical Society website

Fremont County, Colorado
Former counties of the United States
1859 establishments in Kansas Territory
Populated places established in 1859
Populated places disestablished in 1861